Littlehaven railway station serves the areas of Littlehaven, Holbrook and Roffey in the northeast of the town of Horsham, West Sussex, England.

History 

The London, Brighton and South Coast Railway opened the first part of the line in 1848. However, the stations at Littlehaven, Roffey Road Halt and nearby Ifield were not opened until 1907; Littlehaven opened as Rusper Road Halt and subsequently changed to Littlehaven Crossing Halt and then Littlehaven Halt all within the first year of service. Similarly, Ifield was initially known as Lyons Crossing Halt. Roffey Road Halt closed in 1937.

The station was completely rebuilt with minimal facilities after traffic decreased.

In 2013, work began to extend the platforms to handle 8 carriages (up from 4), which will reduce delays caused by longer trains blocking the road while stopped.

In 2021, platform 2 was extended to handle 12 carriages, to allow passengers to embark and disembark from the whole train without walking down the train, and to avoid trains blocking the road crossing.

Level crossing 

There is a level crossing at the eastern (London) end of the platforms, where the line crosses Rusper Road. The crossing gates were considered for replacement with modern barriers in the early 1990s but as there was a history of late passengers running over the crossing to catch their train it was dismissed. Therefore, the adjacent signal box was staffed 24 hours a day. In October 2012 the level crossing was rebuilt and automatic barriers installed to replace the old fashioned gates. This meant that the crossing operator's job was now redundant, with CCTV used to control the crossing from the Three Bridges signal centre. This upgrade was finally made necessary due to a number of incidents of people driving through the wooden gates when closed, resulting in expensive replacement gates having to be constructed.

Facilities
Facilities include disabled access to both platforms via side ramps from the level crossing, and a ticket office on the Horsham-bound platform. Its opening hours are 0640–1334 Monday to Saturday only.
In early 2022, Govia Thameslink Railway intend to close the current ticket office permanently. Ticket vending machines are located on both platforms for customers to purchase tickets. Their sales information highlighted that 96% of pre Covid ticket sales at Littlehaven were purchased via the ticket vending machines.

Services
Thameslink operate all off-peak services at Littlehaven using  EMUs.

The typical off-peak service in trains per hour is:
 2 tph to  via Redhill,  and 
 2 tph to 

On Sundays, there is an hourly service in each direction although northbound trains run to London Bridge only.

References

External links 

Horsham District
Railway stations in West Sussex
Former London, Brighton and South Coast Railway stations
Railway stations in Great Britain opened in 1907
Railway stations served by Govia Thameslink Railway